Peter McCue (1895–1923) was a racehorse and sire influential in the American Quarter Horse Association (or AQHA), although he died before the AQHA was formed.

Life

Peter McCue (foaled 1895) was registered in the American Stud Book as a Thoroughbred, sired by Duke of the Highlands, but his breeder and his breeder's family always maintained that he was actually sired by a Quarter Horse stallion named Dan Tucker. His dam was a Thoroughbred mare named Nora M, who was a double-bred descendant of the imported stallion Glencoe. One story has it that, the horse was named after a neighbor of the Watkins' family, Peter McCue.'

Racing Career and breeding record 
Peter McCue raced for a number of years, then was retired to stud, standing in Illinois, Texas, Oklahoma, and Colorado before his death in 1923. Among his offspring were Hickory Bill, A D Reed, Shiek P-11, Chief P-5, Harmon Baker, John Wilkens and Jack McCue.

Honors 
Peter McCue was inducted into the AQHA Hall of Fame in 1991.

Pedigree

Notes

References

 All Breed Pedigree Database Pedigree of Peter McCue retrieved on June 23, 2007
 AQHA Hall of Fame accessed on September 1, 2017

Further reading

 Burlingame, Milo "Peter McCue – As I Knew Him ..." Quarter Horse Journal, July 1959
 Burlingame, Milo "The Truth About Peter McCue" Texas Livestock Journal December 15, 1949
 Chamberlain, Richard "Quarter Paths" Quarter Racing Journal August 1988
 Denhardt, Robert M. "About Peter McCue" Quarter Horse Journal June 1971
 Denhardt, Robert M. " 'Peter McCue': A Wonder Horse" The Cattleman October 1939
 Dinsmore, Wayne "The Racing Record of Peter McCue" Quarter Horse Journal November 1951
 Estes, J. A. "Pedigree Points: Folklore of the Southwest" The Blood-Horse January 15, 1944
 Estes, J. A. "Pedigree Points: Peter McCue, Quarter Horse" The Blood-Horse July 11, 1942
 Estes, J. A. "Pedigree Points: Peter McCue's Pop" The Blood-Horse January 30, 1943
 Estes, J. A. "Pedigree Points: The Peter McCue Argument Ends" The Blood-Horse February 9, 1946
 Estes, J. A. "Pedigree Points: The Peter McCue Scrap" The Blood-Horse November 6, 1948
 Estes, J. A. "Pedigree Points: The Strange Case of Peter McCue" The Blood-Horse November 28, 1942
 Groves, Lesli Krause " 'How Peter Won the Race' " Quarter Horse Journal March 1995
 Groves, Lesli Krause "Happy Birthday, Peter McCue" Quarter Horse Journal February 1995
 Reynolds, Franklin "His Blood is Everywhere" Western Livestock May 1949
 "The Story of Peter McCue" The Quarter Horse September 1948

External links
 Peter McCue at Quarter Horse Directory
 Peter McCue at Foundation Horses
 Peter McCue at Quarter Horse Legends
 Peter McCue at Western Horseman

American Quarter Horse racehorses
American Quarter Horse sires
1895 racehorse births
1923 racehorse deaths
Thoroughbred family A18
AQHA Hall of Fame (horses)